Charyl Marlyz Chacón Ramírez is a pageant titleholder, was born in Lima, Peru on July 5, 1985, and grew up in Maracay, Aragua state, Venezuela. She was the official winner of the Señorita Deporte Venezuela 2007 (Miss Sports Venezuela) pageant held in  Caracas, Venezuela on August 15, 2007. Chacón represented the Araya Peninsula in the Miss Venezuela 2008 pageant, on September 10, 2008.

Currently, she co-hosts the morning variety show La Bomba on Televen.

References

External links
Miss Venezuela Official Website
Miss Venezuela La Nueva Era MB

1985 births
Living people
People from Lima
People from Maracay
Venezuelan female models